South Wilton is a census-designated place (CDP) in the town of Wilton, Fairfield County, Connecticut, United States. It is in the southern part of the town along U.S. Route 7, in the valley of the Norwalk River. It is bordered to the north by Wilton Center and to the south by the city of Norwalk.

South Wilton was first listed as a CDP prior to the 2020 census.

References 

Census-designated places in Fairfield County, Connecticut
Census-designated places in Connecticut